This is the list of winners and nominees of the César Award for Best Foreign Film.

Winners and nominees

1970s

1980s

1990s

2000s

2010s

2020s

Awards by nation

Notes

See also
Lumières Award for Best French-Language Film
Academy Award for Best International Feature Film
BAFTA Award for Best Film Not in the English Language

References

External links 
  
 César Award for Best Foreign Film at AlloCiné

Adapted from the article César Award for Best Foreign Film, from Wikinfo, licensed under the GNU Free Documentation License.

Foreign film
 
Film awards for Best Foreign Language Film